Morgan Run Natural Environment Area is a protected area in Carroll County, Maryland.

See also
Natural Environment Area (Maryland)

References

External links
Maryland Department of Natural Resource: Morgan Run Natural Environment Area

Protected areas of Carroll County, Maryland
Nature reserves in Maryland